"The Kid Is Hot Tonite" is a song by Canadian rock group Loverboy. It was released in 1981 as the second and final single from their debut album, Loverboy. The song is interpreted by some to be about up-and-coming fellow Canadian singer/guitarist Bryan Adams. While not as big a chart success as their debut single, "Turn Me Loose", the song still reached number 20 in Canada and number 55 in the United States.

Record World said the song has "winning guitar/synthesizer strains and a smashing chorus hook."

Charts

Other versions
The song was covered by Canadian punk band Chixdiggit.  It appears on Fubar: The Album which is the soundtrack to the film FUBAR.

References

1981 singles
1982 singles
Loverboy songs
Song recordings produced by Bruce Fairbairn
Songs written by Paul Dean (guitarist)
1981 songs
Columbia Records singles